Kadua river is located in Odisha state, India, and formed by the confluence of two streams at Charigan village. It runs for a distance of 22 miles draining the area between Prachi and Kushabadra rivers before joining the Bay of Bengal.

References

External links 
Kadua river in wikimapia

Rivers of Odisha
Rivers of India